Class 46 may refer to:

British Rail Class 46
G&SWR 46 Class
LSWR 46 class
New South Wales 46 class locomotive
PKP class SU46